Aino may refer to:
 Aino (given name), a first name in Finland and Estonia
 Ainu people (sometimes called Aino), an ethnic group of northern Japan 
 Ainu language (also sometimes called Aino), the language of the Ainu people
 Aino, Nagasaki, Japan, a former town, merged in 2005 into the city of Unzen
 Mount Aino, a mountain in Japan
 Sony Ericsson Aino, a telephone

Arts and entertainment
 Aino (Kajanus), a symphonic poem for male chorus and orchestra by Robert Kajanus
 Aino (mythology), a figure in the Finnish national epic poem Kalevala
 Aino (opera), a 1912 opera by Erkki Melartin based on the epic poem above
 Minako or Mina Aino, alter ego of Sailor Venus in the Sailor Moon franchise

Train stations
 Aino Station (Hyōgo), a train station in Sanda, Hyōgo Prefecture, Japan
 Aino Station (Shizuoka), a train station in Fukuroi, Shizuoka Prefecture, Japan

See also
 Ainos (disambiguation)
 Ainu (disambiguation)